"Love Junk" is a song by Australian rock musician Johnny Diesel. It is his first solo release since leaving Johnny Diesel and the Injectors in early 1991 and is the only song in his career to be credited to Johnny Diesel, as subsequent releases were either as Diesel or Mark Lizotte. The song was released on 2 June 1991 and peaked at 19 in Australia. It is included on his debut solo album, Hepfidelity (1992).

Track listing
Australian CD single
 "Love Junk" – 3:44
 "Love Junk" (violent) – 4:00

Chart performance
"Love Junk" debuted at No. 41 on the Australian Singles Chart in June 1991 before peaking at No. 19 in July.

Weekly charts

References

External links
 

1991 singles
1991 songs
Chrysalis Records singles
Diesel (musician) songs
Songs written by Diesel (musician)
Song recordings produced by Terry Manning